Matthew William Wenstrom (born November 4, 1970) is an American former basketball player.  He played for the Boston Celtics in the National Basketball Association (NBA) during the 1993-94 NBA season.

Wenstrom, a highly-ranked 7'1 center from Mayde Creek High School in Houston, Texas, played collegiately at the University of North Carolina and was a reserve on the Tar Heels 1993 national championship team as a senior.  Wenstrom's career averages were 4.0 minutes, 1.6 points and 1.1 rebounds per game.

Undrafted in the 1993 NBA Draft, Wentrom nonetheless made the Boston Celtics roster as a free agent.  He appeared in 11 games during the 1993–94 season, averaging 1.6 points and 1.1 rebounds per game in his only NBA season.

In the 1994–95 season, he played for Austrian Bundesliga side Trodat Wels, followed by a stint (1995 until February 1998) at German team TuS Herten.

References

1970 births
Living people
American men's basketball players
Basketball players from Houston
Boston Celtics players
Centers (basketball)
McDonald's High School All-Americans
North Carolina Tar Heels men's basketball players
Parade High School All-Americans (boys' basketball)
Undrafted National Basketball Association players